was an unofficial designation given to certain retired elder Japanese statesmen who served as informal extraconstitutional advisors to the emperor, during the Meiji, Taishō, and Shōwa eras in Japanese history.

The institution of genrō originated with the traditional council of elders (Rōjū) common in the Edo period; however, the term genrō appears to have been coined by a newspaper only in 1892. The term is sometimes confused with the Genrōin (Chamber of Elders), a legislative body which existed from 1875–1890; however, the genrō were not related to the establishment of that body or its dissolution.

Experienced leaders of the Meiji Restoration were singled out by the Emperor as genkun, and asked to act as Imperial advisors. With the exception of Saionji Kinmochi, all the genrō were from medium or lower ranking samurai families, four each from Satsuma and Chōshū, the two former domains that had been instrumental in the overthrow of the former Tokugawa shogunate in the Boshin War of the Meiji Restoration of 1867–1868. The genrō had the right to select and nominate Prime Ministers to the Emperor for approval.

The first seven genrō were all formerly members of the Sangi (Imperial Council) which was abolished in 1885. They are also sometimes known to historians as the Meiji oligarchy, although not all of the Meiji oligarchs were genrō.

The institution expired in 1940, with the death of the last of the genrō, Saionji Kinmochi.

List of genrō

See also

 Council of Elders of the Bundestag (Germany)
 Privy council

References

Japanese politicians
Politics of the Empire of Japan
Japanese historical terms